Fi Shoo' ( 'on longing') (also Romanized Fi Shouq', Fi Shou' )  (:: Lebanese Arabic: fee shou' )  is the debut studio album by Layal Abboud, started recording on October 13, 2007, and released on November 27, 2008. In April 2008, she performed this album in a concert in Amman, Jordan for the first time. The album has a variety of styles. Her first single, Hawasi Kella, included a featuring with Ihsan al-Mounzer, who arranged Mashghoul Bali Alaik.

Trackliste 
  Fi Shouq
  Hawasi Kella
 Abouya Alli
  Mashghoul Bali Alaik
 Am Behlamak
 Wen Ya Wen
 Chobi
 Albi Yomma

References 

Layal Abboud albums
2008 albums
Arabic-language albums
Lebanese Arabic